The Sun Metals Solar Farm is a photovoltaic solar power station near Townsville in the Australian state of Queensland. It supplies some of the electricity consumed by the nearby Sun Metals (a subsidiary of Korea Zinc) zinc refinery as well as exporting to the National Electricity Market. When the Sun Metals Solar Farm started exporting electricity to the grid in May 2018, it took over from Clare Solar Farm as the largest capacity solar farm in Queensland.

The project statutory approvals were supported by AECOM Australia Pty Ltd. 

Construction was undertaken by RCR Tomlinson. The solar farm is connected to the refinery's existing 33/132kV substation and consists of over 1 million solar panels.

The photovoltaic cells are thin-film with single axis tracking.

References

Solar power stations in Queensland
Buildings and structures in Townsville